The W National Park or W Regional Park is a major national park in West Africa around a meander in the River Niger shaped like the letter W. The park includes areas of the three countries Niger, Benin and Burkina Faso, and is governed by the three governments. Until 2008, the implementation of a regional management was supported by the EU-funded project ECOPAS (Protected Ecosystems in Sudano-Sahelian Africa). The three national parks operate under the name W Transborder Park.. In Benin, W National Park is contiguous with Pendjari National Park which is also under the management of African Parks.

History
The W National Park of Niger was created by decree on 4 August 1954, and since 1996 has been listed as a UNESCO World Heritage Site. Within Niger, the Park is listed as a National Park, IUCN Type II, and is part of a larger complex of Reserves and protected areas. These include the adjacent Dallol Bosso (Wetlands of International Importance (Ramsar) on the eastern bank of the Niger River and the partial overlap of the smaller "Parc national du W" (Wetlands of International Importance (Ramsar). The three parks are BirdLife International Important Bird Areas (IBAs) of types A1 and A3 (IBA codes IBA NE001, IBA BF008, and IBA BJ001).

Geography

In the three nations, the Regional park covers some  largely uninhabited by humans, having been until the 1970s a Malarial zone of wetlands formed by the delta of the Mékrou River with the Niger, broken by rocky hills. Historically, the area has been at one time a major area of human habitation, judged by the important archaeological sites (mostly tombs) found in the area.

Flora
In the national park, A total of 454 species of plants were recorded, including two orchids found only in Niger. The park also constitute the southern limit of tiger bush plateaus distribution in Niger.

Fauna
The park is known for its large mammals, including aardvark, baboon, African buffalo, caracal, cheetah, African bush elephant, hippopotamus, African leopard, West African lion, serval and warthog. The park provides a home for some of West Africa's last wild African elephant. However, the rare West African giraffe, today restricted to small parts of the Niger, is absent from the park. The W Park is also known for historic occurrence of packs of the endangered West African wild dog, although this canid may now be extirpated from the area.

The National Park is one of the last strongholds for the Northwest African cheetah. A small population of 25 individuals is estimated to be resident across the W–Arli–Pendjari protected area complex.

The W National Park is also known for its bird populations, especially transitory migrating species, with over 350 species identified in the park. The park has been identified by BirdLife International as an Important Bird Area.

Gallery

See also

 Pendjari National Park

References

Literature
 Convers Arnaud, Chaibou Issa, Binot Aurélie, Dulieu Dominique (2007) La gestion de la transhumance dans la zone d’influence du parc régional du w par le programme ecopas: une « approche projet » pour l’aménagement de la périphérie du parc. Vertigo Hors Série 4. URL : http://vertigo.revues.org/761 ; DOI : 10.4000/vertigo.761 
 Benoit M (1998) Statut et usage du sol en périphérie du parc national du "W" du Niger. Tome 1 : Contribution à l’étude du milieu naturel et des ressources végétales du canton de Tamou et du Parc du "W". ORSTOM, Niamey, Niger, 41 p. 
 Doussa S (2004) Les impacts de la culture cotonnière sur la gestion des ressources naturelles du Parc W. Maitrise, Université de Ouagadougou.
 Grégoire JM, Fournier A, Eva H & Sawadogo L (2003) Caractérisation de la dynamique des feux et de l’évolution du couvert dans le Parc du W: Burkina Faso, Bénin et Niger. 64 S. 
 Hogan C.Michael (2009) Painted Hunting Dog: Lycaon pictus, GlobalTwitcher.com, ed. N. Stromberg
 
 Nacoulma, B.M.I. (2012): Dynamique et stratégies de conservation de la végétation et de la phytodiversité du complexe écologique du Parc National du W du Burkina Faso. PhD thesis, Université de Ouagadougou.
 Nacoulma, B.M.I., Schmidt, M., Hahn, K., Thiombiano, A. (2020): A checklist of vascular plants of the W National Park in Burkina Faso, including the adjacent hunting zones of Tapoa-Djerma and Kondio. Biodiversity Data Journal 8: e54205. 
 
 
 Rabeil T (2003) Distribution potentielles des grands mammifères dans le Parc du W au Niger. Doctoral Thesis, Univ. Paris VII. 463 S. 
 Price et al. (2003) The “W” Regional Park of Benin, Burkina Faso and Niger - Building on a Process of Regional Integration to Address both Local Interests and Transboundary Challenges. World Parks Congress 2003, Durban, RSA. In: Pansky, Diane (ed.). 2005. Governance Stream of the Vth World Parks Congress. Ottawa, Canada: Parks Canada and IUCN/WCPA. ISBN R62-375/2003E-MRC 0-662-40433-5. 
 W National Park of Niger. 2009. 
 Zwarg A, Schmidt M, Janßen T, Hahn K, Zizka G (2012) Plant diversity, functional traits and soil conditions of grass savannas on lateritic crusts (bowé) in south eastern Burkina Faso. Flora et Vegetatio Sudano-Sambesica 15: 15–24.

External links

Detailed Nigerien government tourist map.
WCMC World Heritage Site Data Sheet
UNESCO Page on W National Park
BirdLife IBA Factsheet 'W' National Park.
Le Parc du W du Niger (Niger, Burkina Faso, Bénin): Aires protégées Burkina Faso - Niger - Bénin. Centre IRD d'Orléans Research Summary, University of Orleans (France)

Nature conservation in Burkina Faso
National parks of Benin
National parks of Burkina Faso
National parks of Niger
Biosphere reserves of Benin
Biosphere reserves of Burkina Faso
Biosphere reserves of Niger
World Heritage Sites in Niger
Ramsar sites in Benin
Ramsar sites in Burkina Faso
Ramsar sites in Niger
Niger River
Protected areas established in 1954
Important Bird Areas of Benin
Important Bird Areas of Burkina Faso
Important Bird Areas of Niger